Hi Jinx at the Vanguard is a live album by trumpeter Red Rodney with multi-instrumentalist Ira Sullivan which was recorded at the Village Vanguard and released on the Muse label in 1984.

Reception

The AllMusic review by Scott Yanow stated "The modern setting (which still had a jam session feel since the band had only been playing together a week before appearing at the Vanguard) brought out the best in these talented musicians".

Track listing
 "Hi Jinx" (Jack Walrath) – 7:28
 "On the Seventh Day" (Walrath) – 5:00
 "Days of Wine and Roses" (Henry Mancini, Johnny Mercer) – 8:44
 "I Remember You" (Victor Schertzinger, Mercer)	– 7:20
 "I Got It Bad (and That Ain't Good)" (Duke Ellington, Paul Francis Webster) – 8:18
 "Let's Cool One" (Thelonious Monk) – 5:20

Personnel
Red Rodney – trumpet, flugelhorn
Ira Sullivan - flute, soprano saxophone, tenor saxophone, flugelhorn
Garry Dial – piano
Paul Berner – bass
Tom Whaley – drums

References

Muse Records live albums
Red Rodney live albums
Ira Sullivan live albums
1984 live albums
Albums produced by Bob Porter (record producer)
Albums recorded at the Village Vanguard